Courthope is an English surname originating in the country's South-East and historically most prevalent in Kent and Sussex. Notable people with the surname include:

the Courthope baronets
George Courthope (1616–1685), English politician
Sir George Courthope, MP for Rye between 1906 and 1945
George Frederick Courthope, London-based silversmith and jeweller in the 19th century 
Nathaniel Courthope (1585– 1620), English merchant
Peter Courthope, brother to Nathaniel Courthope and owner of Danny House in the 17th century
 William Courthope, MP for Hastings in 1420 and 1421
William Courthope (officer of arms) (1808–1866), English  genealogist and herald
William John Courthope, writer and historian